Heppell is a surname. Notable people with the surname include:

Bruno Heppell (born 1972), Canadian football player
Cole Heppell (born 1993), Canadian actor
Dyson Heppell (born 1992), Australian rules footballer
George Heppell (1916–1993), English footballer
John Heppell (born 1948), British politician
Martin Heppell (born 1974), Australian rules footballer